The Bachsas Award for Best Actress is awarded by the Bachsas (Bangladesh Cholochitra Sangbadik Samity) Awards in Bangladesh.

Winners

Superlatives
Oldest Winner'' - Babita (64)Youngest Winner''' - Mahiya Mahi (20)

Most Awards
Moushumi and Bobita - 5 awards
Kabari - 4 awards
Popy- 3 awards
Shabana, Shabnur, Apu Biswas and Mahiya Mahi - 2 awards each

References

Bangladeshi awards